Kimmy Dora: Kambal sa Kiyeme (theatrically named as Kimmy Dora) is a 2009 Filipino comedy film co-produced and directed by Joyce Bernal and written by Chris Martinez, starring Eugene Domingo. It is the first installment of the Kimmy Dora film series. The film is a co-production of Spring Films and MJM Productions and was distributed to theaters nationwide on September 2, 2009 by Solar Entertainment Corporation and Star Cinema.

The film tells the story of twin sisters Kimmy and Dora, both played by Eugene Domingo.

The film also served as the launching movie for Domingo.

Plot
Kimmy and Dora GoDongHae are the identical twin daughters of wealthy conglomerate chairman, Luisito GoDongHae. Kimmy is an intelligent high-ranking employee in her father’s company with a combative, ill-tempered personality, while Dora is sweet, naïve, and dimwitted. While on the road, Dora adopts a stray dog and names it Mikky, much to her sister’s annoyance. When Kimmy becomes extremely jealous that Johnson, an employee she is infatuated with, has feelings for Dora, Kimmy takes Mikky and abandons him in the middle of nowhere out of spite. This leads to an intense argument between the twins which soon turns physical, and causes Luisito to suffer a heart attack.

Recovering in the hospital, Luisito decides to give Dora majority ownership of the company in his will, believing Kimmy will be able to survive on her own. Feeling this to be unfair, Kimmy discusses with her lawyer, Harris, and inadvertently orders a hit on Dora while yelling at her maid to kill a cockroach.

At their father’s birthday party, Kimmy locks Dora in the bathroom and disguises herself as her twin so she can meet with Johnson. Three men hired by Harris mistake Kimmy for Dora, kidnap her, and take her to the countryside.

Kimmy manages to escape and is taken in by local farmer, Barry. Kimmy soon bonds with the locals and Barry, for whom she develops feelings. Meanwhile, to keep the company running and to not further distress Luisito, Johnson trains Dora to act like Kimmy and pretend to be her until she can be found. Struggling at first, Dora eventually becomes a successful stand-in for her older sister.

After a successful press conference, Luisito overhears Johnson and Dora and finds out about their ruse. He alerts the police who soon arrest Harris. After saying goodbye to Barry and getting on a bus to take her home, Kimmy narrowly escapes the kidnappers again and they are arrested by the police.

Upon learning that Dora is impersonating her, Kimmy rushes to the company building and confronts her, accusing Dora of having her kidnapped. The ensuing brawl between the twins leads to the roof where they are surrounded by the police who are there to arrest Kimmy but are confused by the twins wearing the same outfit. Both sisters insist that they are Dora and the other is Kimmy. Luisito arrives and explains Harris’s misunderstanding, whereupon Kimmy surrenders herself.

The issue is resolved with Harris and the kidnappers going to jail. Back at her office, Luisito reveals to Kimmy that he plans to move to the United States with Dora, and tells Kimmy how much he appreciates her and what she’s done for the company. While taking time to reflect on her own, Kimmy finds Mikky and takes him home. Kimmy apologizes to Dora, the two reconcile, and Dora and their father decide not to move after all.

Cast

Main Cast
Eugene Domingo as Kimmy/Dora GoDongHae
Dingdong Dantes as Johnson
Zanjoe Marudo as Barry

Supporting Cast
Ariel Ureta as Luisito GoDongHae
Moi Bien as Elena
Miriam Quiambao as Gertrude
Mura as Herbal Doctor
Baron Geisler as Harris
Phillip Nolasco as Manny
Gabby Eigenmann as Kidnapper 
Archie Alemania as Kidnapper 
Zeppi Borromeo as Kidnapper

Special Guest
Maria Alyssa Janela Calma as Young Kimmy Go Dong Hae and Young Dora Go Dong Hae
Tess Antonio as Employee / Taong Grasa
John Feir as Manong Maning

Cameos
Several Filipino celebrities made cameo appearances in the movie.

Piolo Pascual
Marvin Agustin as one of the waiters
Christian Bautista as one of the waiters
Mark Bautista as the Doctor
Cristalle Belo-Henares
Vhong Navarro as one of the waiters
Rufa Mae Quinto
Erik Santos as one of the waiters
Paolo Ballesteros as one of the waiters
Jinggoy Estrada
Aiza Seguerra as the lounge singer
Regine Velasquez as the English teacher

Release

Box office
The film officially premiered on September 2, 2009 in 90 theaters around the Philippines. It became the number one movie to premiere during that week, beating out four Hollywood films and one local film.

Critical reception
Reviews for the film have been largely positive, with Butch Francisco of the Philippine Star proclaiming it as one of the more intelligent local comedy films in a long time.

Much of the critical praise has particularly been given to the performance of lead actress Eugene Domingo. Czeriza Valencia of the Philippine Entertainment Portal notes that Domingo served as the funny factor in the film, since her skillful execution in playing the two roles made the situations hilarious. Lito Zulueta of the Philippine Daily Inquirer writes that Domingo's performance "runs the gamut of comic inventiveness" and "confirms her status as the country’s funniest comic ingénue".

Sequel

A sequel entitled Kimmy Dora and the Temple of Kiyeme premiered in theaters nationwide on June 13, 2012. The film was shot in South Korea.

Prequel

In late 2013, it was confirmed that there would be a prequel to the first two movies of the Kimmy Dora series, to be entitled Kimmy Dora: Ang Kiyemeng Prequel. The film was an official entry to the 2013 Metro Manila Film Festival.

References

External links

2009 films
2000s films
2009 comedy films
2000s English-language films
Films directed by Joyce Bernal
Philippine comedy films
Spring Films films
Star Cinema films
Tagalog-language films
2009 multilingual films
Philippine multilingual films